Djavan (also known by its subtitle, A Voz, O Violão, A Música de Djavan ) is the first album by Brazilian singer and songwriter Djavan. It was released in 1976. The album features some of the singer's early hits, like "Flor de Lis," "Para-Raio", "E Que Deus Ajude" and "Fato Consumado".

Reception
The Allmusic review by Alvaro Neder awarded the album  stars, stating "The highlights are the wonderful melodies, the musical sonority of his lyrics (it even doesn't matter if you understand them, as his focus is on its musicality), the smart violão of Djavan, and the rich rhythmic interplay between voice and violão. All of the compositions are great, exploring from samba to baião, and, more importantly, it's mostly an acoustic band album, with cool touches of a Rhodes.".

Track listing

Personnel
Altamiro Carrilho – flute
Marciso "Pena" Carvalho – graphic coordinator
Aloysio de Oliveira – executive producer
Edson – keyboards
Edson Frederico – arranger
Helinho – guitar
Hermes – rhythm
Armando Marçal – rhythm
Ariovaldo Contesini Paulinho – drums
Sergio Seabra – mastering
Victor – mixing, technician

References 

Djavan albums
1976 debut albums